Jan Choinski (born 10 June 1996) is a German-born British tennis player of Polish descent. Choinski has a career high ATP singles ranking of world No. 218, achieved in February 2023.

Juniors
Choinski reached the semifinals of the 2014 US Open – Boys' singles. He peaked at No. 17 combined world ranking, compiling a 78–30 match record in singles.

Professional career
Choinski made his ATP main draw debut at the 2016 MercedesCup, where he was given a wildcard into the singles event.

Ranked No. 457, he reached his second Challenger final at the 2022 Campeonato Internacional de Tênis de Campinas being the first qualifier in the history of the tournament to do so. He won his maiden Challenger title defeating Juan Pablo Varillas, moving more than a 150 positions back up close to the top 300 at No. 301 on 10 October 2022. He returned to the top 250 on 19 December 2022.

Personal life
Choinski was representing Germany from the beginning of his career until the end of 2018.
He now plays for Great Britain. His mother is from Southampton.

ATP Challenger and ITF Futures/World Tennis Tour finals

Singles: 23 (12–11)

Doubles: 8 (3–5)

References

External links

1996 births
Living people
German male tennis players
Sportspeople from Koblenz
British male tennis players
German people of Polish descent
British people of Polish descent